I Got a Brand New Egg Layin' Machine is the debut mini album of Goon Moon released on Suicide Squeeze Records. According to member Chris Goss the album "... runs the gamut from pure rock to tracks that just sound like noise." The cover art was done by Jesse LeDoux.

Releases
Suicide Squeeze CD: S 046
Suicide Squeeze 12":

Track listing
"The Wired Wood Shed" - 0:59
"Mud Puppies" - 2:00
"Inner Child Abuse" - 2:51
"The Smoking Man Returns" - 2:26
"At The Kit Kat Klub" - 0:39
"Rock Weird (Weird Rock)" - 2:34
"Mashed" - 2:24
"I Got A Brand New Egg Layin' Machine" - 2:59
"No Umbrellas" - 3:30
"Apartment 31" - 4:43

Personnel
Produced by Goon Moon (Zach Hill, Jeordie White (as Twiggy Ramirez), Chris Goss).
Special Guests: Dimitri, David Catching, Whitey, Scooter Pie, Jonesy The Skin Popper, Frater I.A., Peppy Sevenson, Thin Crust.
Recorded by James Book, Jarred at Regime, Tony Mason.
Mastered by Ed Brooks at RFI.
Design by Jesse LeDoux, Jeff Kleinsmith.

References

External links
SuicideSqueeze.net

Suicide Squeeze Records albums
Goon Moon albums
2005 debut albums